The 2018 CAF Confederation Cup Final was the final of the 2018 CAF Confederation Cup, the 27th edition of Africa's secondary club football tournament organized by the Confederation of African Football (CAF), and the 15th edition under the current CAF Confederation Cup title.

The final was contested in two-legged home-and-away format between Raja CA from Morocco and AS Vita Club from the Democratic Republic of the Congo. The first leg was hosted by Raja CA at the Stade Mohammed V in Casablanca on 25 November 2018, while the second leg was hosted by AS Vita Club at the Stade des Martyrs in Kinshasa on 2 December 2018.

Raja CA won the final 4–3 on aggregate for their second CAF Confederation Cup title. As winners, they earned the right to play in the 2019 CAF Super Cup against the winner of the 2018 CAF Champions League.

Teams

Venues

Road to the final

Note: In all results below, the score of the finalist is given first (H: home; A: away).

Format
The final was played on a home-and-away two-legged basis, with the order of legs determined by the knockout stage draw, which was held on 3 September 2018, 19:00 EET (UTC+2), at the CAF headquarters in Cairo, Egypt.

If the aggregate score was tied after the second leg, the away goals rule would be applied, and if still tied, extra time would not be played, and the penalty shoot-out would be used to determine the winner.

Matches

First leg

Second leg

See also
2018 CAF Champions League Final
2019 CAF Super Cup

References

External links
Total CAF Confederation Cup 2018, CAFonline.com

2018
Final
November 2018 sports events in Africa
December 2018 sports events in Africa
Raja CA matches
AS Vita Club matches
2018–19 in Moroccan football
2018–19 in Democratic Republic of the Congo football
Sport in Casablanca
Sport in Kinshasa
21st century in Casablanca
21st century in Kinshasa
International club association football competitions hosted by Morocco
International club association football competitions hosted by the Democratic Republic of the Congo